The lesser violetear (Colibri cyanotus), also known as the mountain violet-ear, is a medium-sized, metallic green hummingbird species commonly found in forested areas from Costa Rica to northern South America.  This species and the Mexican violetear were formerly considered as conspecific and named the 'green violetear'.

Taxonomy and systematics 

The lesser violetear belongs to the order Apodiformes. Hummingbirds share this order with the swifts, such as the white-collared swift. The name Apodiformes is derived from the Greek words "a pous", meaning "without foot". While apodiforms do in fact have feet, they are quite small and their legs are short and relatively weak. Many birds in this order cannot walk, and thus rarely if ever land on the ground since quick escape from predators is virtually impossible. For this reason members of this order spend a majority of their time in the air.

Subspecies 
The lesser violetear has four sub-species:
 C. c. cabanidis (Heine), 1863) - Costa Rica, western Panama
 C. c. cyanotus (Bourcier, 1843) - Colombia, northwestern Venezuela, Ecuador
 C. c. kerdeli Aveledo & Perez, 1991 - northeastern Venezuela
 C. c. crissalis Todd, 1942 - Peru and Bolivia

Description 

The lesser violetear is roughly medium-sized by hummingbird standards. It is shining green above with a glittering violet ear-patch on the sides of its neck. Its throat and chest are a more glittering green with a shining green belly. The tail is a metallic blue-green with more bronzy central feathers and a prominent black subterminal band.

Vocalizations 
Solitary males sing from high, exposed twigs in their territory every day. Their song is a monotonously repeated sharp and dry “tsu-tzeek” at a rate of about one call per second.

Distribution and habitat

Distribution 
The lesser violetear breeds from the highlands of Costa Rica and western Panama; mountains of northern Venezuela, and the Andes from western Venezuela to western Bolivia.

Habitat 
Common habitats for the lesser violetear are in the canopy and borders of subtropical and lower temperate forest, secondary woodland and scrub, and clearings and gardens in the subtropical zone on both slopes of the Andes. It generally prefers more humid and high-altitude areas, such as cloud forests, than the similar sparkling violetear and is completely absent from the central valley where the sparkling violetear is most prevalent. However, the two species will sometimes be seen in the same areas feeding at flowering Inga trees.

Behavior and ecology

Diet 

The lesser violetear forages alone but tends to gather at flowering trees, especially coffee-shade Inga. They feed at mid-level to canopy and often hold and defend a feeding territory. They primarily feed on nectar and small insects. The lesser violetear has been recorded as attaining the greatest flying speed ever recorded for a hummingbird, with a pair of birds having attained  during a chase, although other species may be able to attain similar speeds.

Breeding 
Like most hummingbirds, the lesser violetear is a solitary nester. The male's only involvement in the breeding process is to attract and mate with the female. The female is then responsible for choosing a nest location, generally on a low, small horizontal branch in a protected area. The nest is small and built from various plant materials, spider webs, and down woven together to form a sturdy cup structure. Two small white eggs are laid within the nest and the female incubates them on her own. Incubation time is 14–18 days. Hatchlings are primarily fed insects due to high nutritional requirements. No information was found on the length of the nestling stage or age at fledgling. Breeding takes place through the wet season into the early dry season, which varies by latitude.

References

 
 
 
 Green violetear stamps (for Costa Rica, El Salvador) with Range Map at bird-stamps.org

External links 

lesser violetear
Hummingbird species of Central America
Birds of Costa Rica
Birds of Panama
Hummingbird species of South America
Birds of the Northern Andes
Birds of the Venezuelan Coastal Range
lesser violetear